Steffan John Browning (born 3 July 1954) is a New Zealand politician of the Green Party of Aotearoa New Zealand. He was elected as a member of the House of Representatives in 2011 and retired in 2017.

Early life
Browning was born in Clyde, New Zealand in 1954. He has been employed by the Soil & Health Association as its spokesperson since 2003.

Political career

Browning is a member of the Green Party of Aotearoa New Zealand. He stood as the Greens candidate in the Kaikōura electorate.

The Greens again won 14 seats and Browning returned to parliament as their last MP from the party list. Based on preliminary election results, he would have missed out.

Homeopathy controversy
In November 2014 the Green Party stripped Browning of his natural health products portfolio, after he signed and shared an online petition supporting the use of homeopathy to treat Ebola virus disease. Party co-leader Metiria Turei described Browning's actions as "a mistake", and said that the portfolio change was designed to reassure the public that the Greens "take health issues seriously". Browning said he did not oppose homeopathy on a personal level.

Announcement that he would not contest the 2017 general election

References

External links
 Profile at Green Party of Aotearoa New Zealand website
 Profile at New Zealand Parliament website

1954 births
Living people
Green Party of Aotearoa New Zealand MPs
New Zealand list MPs
Unsuccessful candidates in the 2002 New Zealand general election
Unsuccessful candidates in the 2005 New Zealand general election
Unsuccessful candidates in the 2008 New Zealand general election
Members of the New Zealand House of Representatives
21st-century New Zealand politicians
People from Clyde, New Zealand